Vila Maior is a former civil parish in the municipality of Santa Maria da Feira, Portugal. In 2013, the parish merged into the new parish Canedo, Vale e Vila Maior. It has a population of 1,438 inhabitants and a total area of 2.71 km2.

References

Former parishes of Santa Maria da Feira